Gulou Station is a transfer station of Line 1 and Line 2 of the Ningbo Rail Transit that started operations on 30 May 2014. It is situated under Zhongshan Road in Haishu District of Ningbo City, Zhejiang Province, eastern China.

Exits

Station layout

Connections

Ningbo Bus Network 
The following bus connections can be made at this station:
Gulou Bus Station 39, 363, 364, 504, 821, 856 (night), 857 (night)
Gulou Bus Stop 2, 2-night, 3, 12, 12-AM peak, 12-PM peak, 14, 15, 19, 39, 50, 52, 58, 238, 380, 504, 515, 622, 637, 804, 804-night, 809, 820, 820-night, 852 (all-night)
Fuqiao Street Bus Stop Routes 6, 30, 118, 305, 360, 380, 501, 516, 517, 527, 812, 819
Yangguang Square Bus Stop Routes 2, 2-night, 15, 19, 28, 39, 58, 360, 503, 515, 517, 518, 789, 852 (all-night), 871 (night), 891 (night)

Notable places nearby
Gulou (Drum Tower), Yongfengku Ruins Park, Yangguang Square, Haishu District Government, West Tower of Tianning Temple, Yuehu Park, Zhongshan Park

References

Railway stations in Zhejiang
Railway stations in China opened in 2014
Ningbo Rail Transit stations